Gutsbezirk Spessart is a rugged unincorporated area in the Main-Kinzig-Kreis in southeast Hesse, Germany. It represents a separate district (name: Spessart, Gmk. No. 61032)

References

Main-Kinzig-Kreis
Unincorporated areas of Germany